LD & the New Criticism was an American experimental pop band
formed by songwriter/producer LD Beghtol. Designed by Beghtol to showcase his less dour songwriting efforts—and to be a highly portable, essentially "live band", unlike his other studio-based projects Flare and moth wranglers—the outfit performed extensively in the New York area, and were a featured band at the 2007 Primavera Sound Festival in Barcelona, Spain. Noted aspects of LD&TNC's live shows were the use of old-fashioned "radio mic'ing" (with the performers clustered around two microphones, in an arc) and their lack of electric bass and drums. The band also contributed the track "Sex Surrogate" to the "ESOPUS 6" invitational CD, Help Wanted, along with Devendra Banhart, Grizzly Bear, and others.

Discography
Tragic Realism, full-length CD (Darla, 2006; Acuarela, 2006)
Amoral Certitudes, seven-song ep (Acuarela, 2007)

External links
 LD&TNC on Myspace
 "If I Think of Love" video
 Erasing Clouds review of "Tragic Realism"
 Test Listen: "AKA Paradise" on NPR

References

2005 establishments in New York (state)
2009 disestablishments in New York (state)
American experimental musical groups
Musical groups established in 2005
Musical groups disestablished in 2009
Darla Records artists